Seth Trembly (born March 21, 1982 in Littleton, Colorado) is a former American soccer defensive midfielder.

Trembly was part of the original 1999 class at the Bradenton Academy, where, as part of the Under-17 United States national team, he trained with Landon Donovan, DaMarcus Beasley, and Bobby Convey, as well as his future teammates at the Rapids, Kyle Beckerman and Jordan Cila.

Rather than go to college, Trembly signed a Project 40 contract with MLS, and was allocated to his hometown team, the Colorado Rapids, joining the club at the end of the 1999 season. In 2000, he played twelve games with the MLS Pro-40 team.  In his first four years, Trembly appeared in a total of 12 games for the Rapids, starting one.  He at last began to break into the team in 2003, when injuries gave him the opportunity to play in 16 games, starting 11, for the team; he registered a goal and an assist. In 2004, he was largely a late defensive substitute, appearing in 24 games, but starting five, playing mostly as a defensive midfielder, but some as an outside back. The Rapids traded Trembly to Salt Lake in early 2005. He scored two goal in his first season with Real Salt Lake, but did not play a minute in 2006 because of two tears to his ACL.  Although he was not able to play he did put his recovery time to good use, putting on a benefit concert for Right to Play, a charity that works to bring soccer to kids in Africa.  He received the reward of  Humanitarian of the Year.  He signed a contract with the Montreal Impact in the United Soccer Leagues for the 2007 season.

Seth currently lives in Utah with his longtime girlfriend where he is a soccer coach for a Utah University.

References

1982 births
Living people
American expatriate sportspeople in Canada
American expatriate soccer players
American soccer players
Colorado Rapids players
Expatriate soccer players in Canada
Association football defenders
Association football midfielders
Association football utility players
Montreal Impact (1992–2011) players
Sportspeople from Littleton, Colorado
Real Salt Lake players
Soccer players from Colorado
Major League Soccer players
A-League (1995–2004) players
USL First Division players
United States men's youth international soccer players
United States men's under-23 international soccer players
MLS Pro-40 players